Major-General Arthur Wilmot Wadeson Holworthy DSO, MC  (12 December 1897 – 1983) was a senior British Indian Army officer who fought in both World War I and World War II.

Military career
Holworthy was commissioned as a second lieutenant on 16 June 1917 during World War I and appointed to the 1st Battalion 3rd Queen Alexandra's Own Gurkha Rifles on 29 June 1917. He was promoted to lieutenant on 18 June 1918 he was awarded the Military Cross for gallantry in Kurdistan in 1919. Promoted to captain on 18 June 1921 he became an instructor at the Army School of Education on 10 June 1929 and then attended the Staff College, Camberley from 1933 to 1934. He became a company commander in the 1st Battalion, 7th Duke of Edinburgh's Own Gurkha Rifles on 17 June 1936 and the Brigade Major for the Jullunder Brigade Area on 15 June 1936, being promoted to the substantive rank of major on 1 July 1939 and Brevet lieutenant-colonel on 1 January 1939.

Holworthy served in World War II as Assistant Commandant of the Junior Commanders School in India from 13 July 1940 to 28 November 1940 before becoming Commander of the Indian 10th Infantry Brigade in 1942 and Commander of the 7th Infantry Brigade in North Africa later that year. Promoted to the substantive rank of lieutenant-colonel on 18 June 1943 and acting major-general on 15 June 1943, he became General Officer Commanding Indian 6th Infantry Division in Persia in 1943.

Holworthy was promoted to war substantive colonel and temporary major-general on 15 June 1944 and became General Officer Commanding Indian 4th Infantry Division in Italy that year. He retired as a colonel and was granted the honorary rank of major general on 15 April 1947.

See also
Iraqforce

References

Bibliography

External links
Generals of World War II

|-

1897 births
1983 deaths
British Indian Army generals
Indian Army generals of World War II
Companions of the Distinguished Service Order
Recipients of the Military Cross
Graduates of the Staff College, Camberley
Indian Army personnel of World War I
People from Shanghai